Bonthorpe is a hamlet in the East Lindsey district of Lincolnshire, England. It is within the civil parish of Willoughby with Sloothby.

Bonthorpe was known as Brunetorp in 1086, located for governance purposes in the wapentake of Calcewath in the South Riding of Lindsey.

References

Villages in Lincolnshire
East Lindsey District